Leduc-Beaumont is a provincial electoral district in Alberta, Canada. The district is one of 87 districts mandated to return a single member (MLA) to the Legislative Assembly of Alberta using the first past the post method of voting.

History
The electoral district was created in the 2010 Alberta boundary re-distribution. It was named after the City of Leduc and Leduc County and the Town of Beaumont. It was created from the old electoral district of Leduc-Beaumont-Devon which was abolished when the town of Devon was transferred into the new district of Drayton Valley-Devon. The other major change from the old riding was the move of land within Camrose County to Battle River-Wainwright. The Leduc-Beaumont district would have a population of 41,902 in 2010 which was 2.5% larger than the provincial average of 40,880.

The 2017 electoral boundaries re-distribution saw areas within the district annexed by the City of Edmonton be transferred to Edmonton constituencies, and the eastern border of this constituency was moved west to hug the eastern borders of the Town of Beaumont, Nisku Industrial Park and the City of Leduc. The land to the east of the new border would be added to the riding of Maskwacis-Wetaskiwin. The district would have a population of 48,337 in 2017, which was 3% above the provincial average of 46,803.

Boundary history

Representation history
The electoral district and its antecedent has elected Progressive Conservative MLAs with solid majorities going back to the 1970s. In the 2015 general election NDP candidate Shaye Anderson was elected, defeating Wildrose candidate Sharon Smith and incumbent George Rodgers. Anderson was appointed Minister of Municipal Affairs in Rachel Notley's cabinet.

Anderson was defeated in the 2019 general election by UCP candidate Brad Rutherford by 7,731 votes.

Elections

2012 general election

2015 general election

2019 general election

Senate nominee results

2012 Senate nominee election district results

Student vote results

2012 election

See also
List of Alberta provincial electoral districts

References

External links
Elections Alberta
The Legislative Assembly of Alberta

Alberta provincial electoral districts
Leduc, Alberta